Elachista berndtiella is a moth of the family Elachistidae. It is found in Spain and Germany.

References

berndtiella
Moths described in 1985
Moths of Europe